Sherwan Haji (born 18 March 1985) is a Finnish - Syrian(Kurd) actor, filmmaker and writer. Haji graduated from the Higher Institute for Dramatic Arts in Damascus. He played leading roles in several TV series for several TV channels in the Middle East.

Haji moved to Finland in 2010 to continue his studies. In 2012, he established a production company called Lion's Line Ltd. Haji has worked as an educator and he has produced documentaries, fiction movies, and art workshops. Haji moved to Cambridge, U.K. to continue his studies, receiving the degree of Master of Arts with distinction in Film and TV Production from Anglia Ruskin University in 2016.

In 2017, Haji worked with Finnish director Aki Kaurismäki, playing a leading role in The Other Side of Hope. He was awarded the prize for best actor at the Dublin International Film Festival for his performance.

References

1985 births
Living people
21st-century Finnish male actors
Syrian actors
Syrian expatriates in Finland
Finnish male film actors
Finnish people of Kurdish descent
Syrian Kurdish people